Jason Adam Griffith  is an American voice actor, known for his voice over work for VSI Los Angeles, NYAV Post, 4Kids Entertainment and DuArt Film and Video. He is best known as the voice of Sonic the Hedgehog and Shadow the Hedgehog in the English dub of Sonic X, as well as in Sonic the Hedgehog video games from 2005 to 2010.

Early life
Jason Griffith was born in Lakeline, Ohio.  He graduated from the North High School in Eastlake, Ohio in 1999.

Career
Griffith began his acting career in 1997, at seventeen years old. He made his feature film debut in the romantic comedy-drama film, Edge of Seventeen in an uncredited role as Scott.

He also had an uncredited role as Cassius in the 2008 thriller film, Kill Kill Faster Faster. In television, he appeared in an episode of Blue Bloods as Suit in Red Sportscar.

Since 2003, Griffith has been working extensively as a voice actor. He voiced many characters in various animated films, television shows and video games, including Tom Majors in Chaotic and Miyamoto Usagi in Teenage Mutant Ninja Turtles. He also did the voice of Bongo the Monkey in the Danimals commercials, he also appeared in the 2015 kids television show Super Wings as Bello and was a promo announcer for 4Kids TV, The CW4Kids and Toonzai.

Griffith is well known as the former voice of SEGA mascot Sonic the Hedgehog (replacing Ryan Drummond), as well as Shadow the Hedgehog (replacing David Humphrey) and Jet the Hawk, in the Sonic the Hedgehog video game series, where he is credited as Jason Griffith and Adam Caroleson.

In 2010, his role as Sonic was passed to Roger Craig Smith, his role as Shadow was passed to Kirk Thornton, and his role as Jet was passed to Michael Yurchak.

Griffith did however, continued to voice Sonic for 4Kids promotions until September 27, 2014, when the Vortexx program came to an end.

From 2011 to 2012, he starred in the web comedy series Casters as Cal.

Personal life
Griffith married Melissa Ryan on August 15, 2015. They have three sons.

Filmography

Film

Television

Animated film

Anime

Animation

Video games

Web

References

External links

Living people
American male actors
American male film actors
American male television actors
American male video game actors
American male voice actors
Male actors from Ohio
Sega people
1980 births